Master Motors is a Pakistani bus and truck manufacturer, based in Karachi, Pakistan since 2002. Master Motors is the authorized assembler and manufacturer of Changan, Daimler Fuso, Foton, Iveco Trucks & Yutong vehicles in Pakistan.

Master Motors is made an agreement with Chinese automobile company Changan Automobile after awarded Greenfield status by Ministry of Industries & Production.

Master Motors is also assembling Italian Iveco Trucks in Pakistan starting from mid 2019.

History
Master Motors Corporation is one of several companies that make up Master Group of Industries. The flagship company Master Enterprises was established in 1963 and with a passage of time the group entered into diversified industries, emerging as one of the leading industrial groups in Pakistan. Master Motors is an ISO certified automobile assembling and manufacturing company formed in 2002.

China’s Changan and Master Motors to set up an automobile manufacturing plant in Karachi. The venture will see a total investment of $100 million by the end of 2018. Master Motors will inject 70% while the remaining amount will come from the Chinese company.

Operations in Pakistan 
In 2023, Foton International Trade Co Ltd signed an MOU with Master Motor Corporation (Pvt.) Limited to invest in a joint venture. MMCL had been manufacturing and selling Foton brand vehicles since 2003 under a technical licensing agreement. During Prime Minister Imran Khan's visit to Beijing for the Belt and Road initiative, he visited the plant of Beiqi Foton and acknowledged MMCL's successful sales of over 17,000 commercial vehicles in the past.

The company achieved significant growth in the past year despite tough competition in the market. The sales figures consistently reflected the trust of Pakistani consumers in their products. With these efforts, Master Motors remained a major player in the Pakistani automobile industry.

Manufacturing Products

Changan
 Changan Alsvin (Subcompact Sedan)
 Changan Oshan X7
 Changan Karvaan

Daimler Fuso
 Fuso Canter Bus 4D34-2A (Minicoach)
 Master Line M-410B (Minibus based on Mitsubishi Fuso Canter)
 Master Grande Super M-410 (Light Truck based on Mitsubishi Fuso Canter)
 Fuso Canter Rocket 4D34-2A (Light/Medium Truck)
 Fuso FV60 Ton - Prime Mover (Heavy Truck)

Iveco
(Coming soon)

Limited Assembly

Foton
 Foton Aumark M-280 (Light Truck)

Yutong
 Yutong-Master YC6MK340-30 (Intercity Bus)

Awards and certification
 ISO 9001:2015 CERTIFIED (Master Motor Corporation is currently in the process of acquiring TS 16949:2002 certification).

References

External links
 Master Motors Corporation official website

Bus manufacturers of Pakistan
Truck manufacturers of Pakistan
Manufacturing companies based in Karachi